A motto is a phrase meant to formally describe the general motivation or intention of a social group or organization.

It can also refer to:

 Aphorism, a short, suggestive expression of a guiding principle
 Motto (surname), surname

People and characters

 Motto McLean (1925–2019), Canadian ice hockey player

Fictional characters
 Peli Motto, a Star Wars character from "The Mandalorian"

Places
 Motto River, Virginia, USA; a tributary of the South River
 Motto Farm, New South Wales, Australia

Literature
 Epigraph (literature), a sentence, phrase, or word, prefixed to an essay, chapter, or the like, suggestive of its subject matter
 A short quotation, joke, or an anecdotal message printed on a piece of paper inside a Christmas cracker

Music
 In music, a head-motif

Songs
 "Motto..." (Kana Nishino song), a single by Japanese singer Kana Nishino
 "Motto" (Tanpopo song), the second single by J-pop group Tanpopo 
 "The Motto" (Drake song), a single by Drake
 "The Motto" (Tiësto and Ava Max song), 2021

Other uses
 Motto Pictures, NYC production company
 Rocco Motto, Italian coachbuilding company established in 1932

See also

 
 List of mottos
 Motto della Tappa, Lugano Prealps, Switzerland-Italy; a mountain
 Motto Motto Motto, a 2003 manga graphic novel by Kazumi Kazui
 

 Motto Motto (disambiguation)
 Moto (disambiguation)
 More (disambiguation)